[R]evolution is the fifth studio album by Sister Machine Gun, released on April 20, 1999 by Positron! Records.

Reception

Steve Huey of allmusic gave [R]evolution a two and a half out of five stars, saying "there are enough strong moments to make the record an overall success."

Track listing

Personnel
Adapted from the [R]evolution liner notes.

Sister Machine Gun
 Chris Randall – lead vocals, guitar, keyboards, programming, production, mixing

Additional performers
 Abel Garibaldi – bass guitar, production, mixing
 Nate Lepine – saxophone
 Shara O'Neil – backing vocals
 Kevin Temple – drums, percussion

Production and design
 Bad Mamma Jamma Ink. – cover art, design
 Van Christie – production, mixing

Release history

References

External links 
 
 

1999 albums
Sister Machine Gun albums
Positron! Records albums